Vemundvik is a village in Namsos municipality in Trøndelag county, Norway. Vemundvik Church is located in the village.  

The village of Vemundvik was the administrative centre of the old municipality of Vemundvik from 1838 until 1941, when the municipal administration moved to the nearby town of Namsos.

Name
The village (and former municipality) is named after the old farm of Vemundvik, where the Vemundvik Church was located. The first part of the name is derived from the male name Vemund and the last part is vik which means cove.

Notable people
Notable people that were born or lived in Vemundvik include:
Jørgen Johannes Havig (1808–1883), politician

References

Villages in Trøndelag
Namsos